Bulbophyllum simulacrum is a species of orchid in the genus Bulbophyllum. It can be found in the Philippines.

References

The Bulbophyllum-Checklist
The Internet Orchid Species Photo Encyclopedia

simulacrum